Alan Pears, AM, is an environmental consultant, and a pioneer of energy efficiency policy in Australia since the late 1970s.

In the 1980s, Pears worked on the Home Energy Advisory Service, star-rating appliance energy labels, and mandatory home insulation regulations, while with the Victorian Government's Energy Information Centre. He has been an environmental consultant since 1991, involved in energy/environmental rating and regulation of buildings, green building developments, and efficient appliance development. He is an adjunct professor at RMIT University, and writes a regular column for ReNew magazine.

Alan Pears was made a Member of the Order of Australia in 2009.

See also
 Trevor Lee (architect)
 Hugh Saddler
 Energy policy in Australia
 Solar power in Australia
 Renewable energy in Australia
 Wind power in Australia

References

Living people
Solar building designers
People associated with renewable energy
Sustainability advocates
Members of the Order of Australia
Year of birth missing (living people)